The Westerpark is a public urban park in Amsterdam, Netherlands. The former borough (stadsdeel) of Westerpark is named after the park, as is the current neighborhood.

The verdant space of the former Westergasfabriek gasworks along Haarlemmerweg has become a place for cultural avant-garde businesses and events.

History

From Westerplantsoen to Westerpark

Up until the early seventeenth century, the Haarlemmerdijk (also called Spaarndammerdijk) constitutes the only connection between Haarlem and Amsterdam. The dike serves as protection against the IJ, but is subject to breakthroughs and floods. At the north of the dike lies a polder, which is the location of today's Westerpark. Its name, Overbraker Binnenpolder, probably refers to its frequent floods. A few farms are built along this dike between Amsterdam and Sloterdijk, then the first village on the road to Haarlem.

In the mid-19th century, Amsterdam struggles with the consequences of the Industrial revolution and the growth of its population. The increasing pollution and deteriorating hygiene conditions lead the city to consider the creation of parks and gardens around the city center. In 1845, Amsterdam's first municipal park, the Westerplantsoen (Western Garden), is created on the Overbraker Binnenpolder.

This first park is appreciated by the local population. Ton Heijdra notes:

The experience, however, is short-lived: in 1869, the park is eliminated to make way for the railroads and canals, most notably the Westerkanaal that connects the  Singelgracht and the Haarlemmertrekvaart to the IJ.

Conception of the park

In October 1866, city engineer Jacob van Niftrik submits his expansion plan for Amsterdam to the alderman for Public Works. This plan recommends the creation of several major parks around the city, but does not include the future Westerpark.

This plan is deemed too ambitious and costly and is rejected by the city council. As a result, the city's director of works, Jan Kalff, is asked to propose a more pragmatic plan, that would "synthesize developments that were underway, rather than steer developments itself".

The original Westerpark is designed in 1890 by landscape architect Leonard Springer. While Westerpark was initially meant to be larger (around 10 hectares), its area is limited by the decision of the city to set up a gas plant, limiting its area to 5.63 hectares.

Construction of the Westergasfabriek

In 1883, the city grants a concession to the Imperial Continental Gas Association to create a plant that would produce town gas for street lighting. The buildings are designed by architect Isaac Gosschalk in the then-popular Dutch neo-renaissance style under the supervision of J. Pazzani, director of the new gas plant, who would decide on the location of the various buildings. This collaboration was intended to create a complex that would be both functional and aesthetically pleasing.

At the time, the site includes several coal storage areas, treatment plants and office buildings that stands in a U-shape around an imposing water tower:

The gas produced from coal is stored in large gas containers, two of which are still visible today
The city puts an end to the concession in 1898, taking over the plant and added an additional coke gas plant.

Partial destruction of the gas plant and transformation of the park

After the second world war, the plant become gradually unnecessary with the extraction of natural gas in the North sea and the discovery of the Groningen gas field.

The production of coal gas is interrupted in 1960, leading to the demolition of several buildings that have become useless. The gas plant keeps producing city gas until 1967, and stops operating altogether after this date.

After the closing of the plant, some of the buildings are demolished, including the water tower, the heavily polluted furnace buildings and the laboratory. Others are left intact:

Difficult conversion into a park

The reconversion process, however, proves complex: the site is heavily contaminated with chemicals, including tar, lead, and cyanide. After the closing of the factory, the city council considers several options, including using the space as a tram depot and widening the Haarlemmerweg. Local residents protest and manage to block these proposals. In 1981, the park is finally designated for recreational activities.

While the city initially considers scrapping the remaining brownfield buildings to make space for the park, it decides in the early 90s to adopt a creative master plan prepared by American landscape architect Kathryn Gustafson. Gustafson proposes to integrate these buildings and reuse them as cultural centres or cafés, along with elements of rural polders, wetland and pools.

In 1991, the entire Westergasfabriek complex is designated as a National Monument. The park is finally opened to the public in 2003.

Train accident

On 21 April 2012, two trains are involved in a head-on collision at Westerpark, near Sloterdijk. Approximately 117 people are injured, one of whom later dies in the hospital.

Current buildings and equipments

The park connects the industrial buildings of the Westergasfabriek in the east with open polder landscape to the north, a Waternatuurtuin (water nature park), a play area, allotments and the Sint Barbara cemetery. The entire 50-hectare area is now referred to as the Westerpark, a name also used for the neighbourhood to the west of the inner city.

Westergasfabriek

To the west of the park lies the group of buildings that remain from the original Westergasfabriek. The historic buildings have been renovated and are now hosting cafés, bars, offices, a cinema and venues for markets and cultural events.

The buildings are quite remarkable for their diversity and are representative of the industrial heritage of the site. Olof Koekebakker writes:

Zuiveringshal

The architectural style of its large purification hall (Zuiveringshal), where sulphur was extracted from the gas, is particularly noticeable:

Canal lock, lock chamber and pump

The lock complex in the Haarlemmertrekvaart was built with the construction of the Westergasfabriek around 1883. It provides a good example of late nineteenth-century water management.

Steel drawbridge

The south-eastern entrance over the Haarlemmervaart consists of a drawbridge that dates back to 1919. Originally situated on the Zijkanaal in Amsterdam-Noord, it was moved to its current location in 1956 to serve as an access bridge to the site of the Westergasfabriek.

Art

The park features several sculptures:
 Michiel Schierbeek’s 1986 "Untitled" sculpture, located at the Nassauplein and inspired by De Stijl
 The wedding dress (Bruidsjurk), a sculpture that floats every year in the Westerpark pond from mid-April to late October. It was created by patchwork, a collective of women, in 1994 
 The "Man on a stool" by Ronald Tolman (1986). The man seems to be looking at another sculpture made by Liesbeth Pallesen
 Herman Makkink's untitled sculpture (2004), often called "Bolbewoners". It represents two bronze figures, having legs instead of arms, sitting on an inclined hemisphere. Makking suggested that this work "relates to the human condition. We are half animal half human and to our great surprise, we come to life on this earth, uninvited, in an almost impossible position. Only by focusing our gaze on the infinite can we overcome this awkward situation'
 "Gold In Your Mind, Gold In Your Feet" by Mirjam Janse, representing a figure bending over backwards

References

Amsterdam-West
Parks in Amsterdam
Urban public parks